NGC 740 is a barred spiral galaxy located in the Triangulum constellation. It is estimated to be 210 million light-years from the Milky Way and has a diameter of about 85,000 light-years. It was discovered by the Irish engineer Bindon Stoney, an assistant to William Parsons.

References

External links 
 

0740
Barred spiral galaxies
Triangulum (constellation)
007316